The Cambodian ambassador to the United States is the official representative of the government of Cambodia in Phnom Penh to the government of the United States in Washington, D.C.

List of representatives

Cambodia–United States relations

References 

 
United States
Cambodia